Farmhouse Kitchen is a cookery series that was produced by Yorkshire Television and aired on the ITV network from 1971 until 1990. It was hosted by Dorothy Sleightholme and later by Grace Mulligan.

The programme, which was shown weekly and usually on a weekday afternoon, was aimed at housewives and homemakers, and sought to educate its viewers by presenting visual demonstrations of old-fashioned British cookery as well as thrifty ways to feed a family on a budget.  Yorkshire Television published a number of cookbooks containing recipes from the show.  Grace Mulligan took over presenting duties in 1982. Celebrity guest cooks such as Mary Berry and Rick Stein were invited onto the programme, and viewers were invited to send in their own recipes to be cooked onscreen,

The memorable, vibraphone-heavy theme music was "Fruity Flutes" by Reg Wale.

References

1971 British television series debuts
1990 British television series endings
1970s British television series
1980s British cooking television series
1990s British cooking television series
British cooking television shows
Television series by ITV Studios
Television series by Yorkshire Television
English-language television shows